Mamoré is a province in the Beni Department, Bolivia. Its towns include San Ignacio, Mamoré.

Name
The province got its name from the Moré language.

References

Provinces of Beni Department